The Israeli expropriation of Palestinian springs in the West Bank is the expropriation of springs in the Israeli-occupied West Bank by Israel, the Israeli water company Mekorot, and by Israeli settlers. The springs and wells, to which Palestinians have a human right in international law, are appropriated exclusively for use by Israelis and visiting tourists.

Nomenclature
Given their importance, many toponyms in Palestine incorporate the word in terms for towns and localities.

Background
The groundwater resources on which Israel depends draw on 3 aquifers, only one of which is in Israel and of the recharge area of the water tables only 5% lies in Israel. The West Bank's resources are either surface run-off channelled in streams and rivers or groundwater and the population down to the 1980s had not been allowed to access more than 14-18% of the total water available. Israel's perceived and programmed water security depends on minimizing Palestinian use of the aquifers in their own territory of the West Bank.

Historically, spring water had always been managed by villages adjacent to springs, which lay within their boundaries. The earlier British mandatory authority had difficulties formulating a water law given the diversity of regional practices, and all efforts by them to do so failed. In that period, however, the Zionist leadership often argued its case for increasing Jewish immigration by asserting that efficient modern techniques of water management would ensure a limitless capacity for absorbing these immigrants: water, they argued, was abundant, all that was lacking was expertise in developing modern infrastructure. The future Israeli water company Mekorot was set up in 1937 to this end. However, with the establishment of the state of Israel, the range estimates for available water resources in Palestine were scaled back significantly, and the imagined abundance was replaced by a recognition of water scarcity. Israel centralized and nationalized its water resources in 1959.

Until 1950, when Jordan claimed the West Bank by annexation – a move not recognized by the international community – most Palestinian villages drew the majority of their water from springs and by collecting rainwater. In the wake of the 1948 Palestine war, the inhabitants of the historic core of Jerusalem and its eastern neighbourhoods had lost access to the Ras al-'Ayn and 'Arrub springs, and, until pumping station facilities were repaired, the severities of rationing were eased by drawing on the springs in Silwan and Sur Bahir.

The springs had traditionally been managed by a communal property regime. Irrigated agriculture in villages mainly depended on these springs. Improved technology allowed wells to be dug in the ensuing decade. Villagers pooled funds in order to create 'well companies' in order to secure finance for drilling. Jordan set up a Jerusalem Water Utility in the mid-1960s, but it serviced only the three cities of Bethlehem, Jerusalem and Ramallah. This project stopped when Israel conquered and occupied the West Bank in 1967.

Israel thereafter did not extend its water laws to the captured territories, which were run by a military administration. That authority quickly issued Military Order no. 92 investing a military officer with all powers regarding the management of water resources in what became the Palestinian territories. Military Order no. 158 later stipulated that wells could be drilled only after obtaining a military permit, and, over the ensuing 23 years, only twenty three such permits were issued.  Springs waters, however, were rarely touched, and the existing regime allowing villages to continue with their property management regarding the use of such resources.

The minimum mean for daily per capita water consumption set by WHO is 100 litres per day: the average in the West Bank is 66 litres. The state-owned Israeli company Mekorot taps springs and drills wells in the West Bank and furnishes settlements with water for all purposes, industrial, agricultural and domestic. It also sells some to Palestinian water utilities, according to schedules Israeli authorities determine to fix the allowable amount. For many villagers whose access to local sources is severely restricted, the result is that they must often purchase trucked-in water priced much higher than that supplied to settlements, and in the poorest communities the monthly outlay for imported water can rise to half of a family income.

Settlement usurpations of springs after 1967

At least 300 springs exist in the West Bank. In the process of establishing Israeli settlements, many of these springs were targeted by the settlers, and the struggle to wrest possession of the areas of the landscape that feature them was, and remains, a notable source of conflict between local Palestinians and the immigrant Jewish communities. In a survey conducted in 2011, the United Nation's Office for the Coordination of Humanitarian Affairs occupied Palestinian territory identified 56 springs that had either been taken over by settlers (30), or were the object of targeting for eventual inclusion into the settlement areas (26). 93% of these were in Area C, on parcels of land that, according to the records of the Israeli Civil Administration, in large part (84%) are registered as private Palestinian property.

One technique relies on the practice by the IDF of declaring large areas of West Bank land military fire zones where (Palestinian) civilians may not enter. The six settler Regional Councils in the West Bank are supposed to operate under a military ordinance regulating their activities within defined municipal boundaries, but, according to Haaretz's Yotam Berger the civil/military administration turns a blind eye to the phenomenon or even encourages the settler groups to develop infrastructure on lands beyond their municipal jurisdiction that are otherwise closed military zones or private Palestinian property.

Many of the sequestered springs are designated as Israeli parks, in a broader process of what has been called 'colonial ecologism', or 'apartheid springs.'

Springs seized for settlements (by 2011)
The following is a list of 30 springs that had fallen under the complete control of Israeli settlements by 2011.

Springs at risk by 2011
The following is a list of Palestinian springs that were considered by United Nations investigators to be at risk of a settler takeover in 2011.

2012-2020
The West Bank Ein Hanya spring, which from Ottoman times down to the end of the British Mandate was recognized as the property of al-Walaja, now lies within the municipal boundaries of Jerusalem, and the inhabitants of the village are cut off from it by Israeli West Bank barrier. It was frequented by Israelis and Palestinians. Problems started when it was designated as a tourist attraction and enclosed within what Israel calls one of its national parks, the Emek Refaim Park. The opening was delayed for two years as police, together with the Jerusalem Municipality and the Nature and Parks Authority, insisted that Palestinians be refused entry, and that the government shift the Ein Yael checkpoint south in order to block Palestinian access, an operation that would cost $3.4 million. It was opened to Jews for three days during the Sukkot festival, which coincided with the Palestinian olive picking season but Palestinians, even those wishing to harvest the fruits of their olive groves, are denied access, a ban extending also to the inhabitants of al-Walaja itself, who own  of the area.

Incidents

Three members of the Shnerb family, from Lod in Israel, were hiking in the West Bank when a bomb planted at Ein Bubin was made to explode, killing the girl, and injuring her brother and father. The murder took place near to the Palestinian village of Deir Ibzi, whose lower lands near the spring area are abandoned because they are denied access save for two or three days a year. Israeli settlements are considered illegal under international law, something Israel disputes, and over 600,000 Jews have come to live in roughly 140 of such settlements since Israel occupied the area militarily in 1967. Springs in particular are flashpoints in the conflict between Israelis who come to settle in the West Bank and the local Palestinian villagers, with, according to Dror Ektes, over 60 springs so far seized in the past 10 years, and thereupon reserved for Jewish use only.

Palestinians in six adjacent villages, Kobar, Ras Karkar, Al-Janiya, Deir 'Ammar, Al-Mazra'a al-Qibliya and Beitillu – all cut off from each other through prohibitions on road use – have been denied access to their groves, springs and grazing land by a variety of settler and army measures – vandalism of trees, military orders, and assaults.

Five of the villages' nine springs have, she claims, been appropriated from Palestinians, who formerly used them for swimming, picnicking and for agricultural purposes. The seizures adapt them as recreational sites exclusively for settlers and touring Israeli Jews. The loss of land and water resources has, she continues, dealt an economic blow to inhabitants of the six villages, causing many families to rely now on aid.  With regard to the incident specifically Hass concluded that, 'those who prepared the bomb certainly know that this is Israel's strategy in the West Bank. Individual settlements are turned into broad blocs, for Jews only, and are boasting of abundance, serenity, commercial centers, vineyards, orchards, hiking trails and Judaized natural springs.'

See also
 Wadi Qana

Notes

Citations

Sources

Israeli–Palestinian conflict
West Bank